Psychopathia Sexualis is a 2006 American erotic drama film written and directed by Bret Wood. The film's vignettes are based on the sexual perversity study of the same name by Richard von Krafft-Ebing, who is portrayed in the film by Ted Manson.

Cast
 Ted Manson as Professor Richard von Krafft-Ebing
 Kristi Casey as Blood woman
 David Weber as Blood man
 Zoë Cooper as Shepherdess
 Patrick L. Parker as Emil Fourquet
 Daniel Thomas May as J.H.
 Patricia French as Antoinette
 Daniel Pettrow as Xavier

Production
Psychopathia Sexualis was shot in Atlanta, Georgia.

Release
The film was given a limited release on June 8, 2006, opening in three North American theaters. It grossed $1,612 in its opening weekend, averaging $537 per theater, and, by the end of its four-week run, made $4,012.

Critical reception
The film received mixed to negative reviews from critics. On review aggregator website Rotten Tomatoes, the film has a 23% rating based on 13 critics, with an average rating of 4.4/10. On Metacritic, the film has an assigned 40/100 rating based on 10 critics, indicating "mixed or average reviews".

References

External links
 
 
 
 

2006 films
2000s English-language films
2000s erotic drama films
American erotic drama films
American independent films
American anthology films
Films shot in Atlanta
Films based on non-fiction books
2006 drama films
2006 independent films
2000s American films